is a traditional (koryū) school of Japanese martial arts founded by Tsukahara Bokuden in the Muromachi period (c.1530).

Due to its formation during the tumultuous Sengoku Jidai, a time of feudal war, the school's techniques are based on battlefield experience and revolve around finding weak points in the opponent's armor. The sword (katana), spear (yari) and glaive (naginata) are some of the weapons used by the school. The current headmaster of the school is Yoshikawa Tsuenetaka.

Kashima Shintō-ryū formerly had a series of iaijutsu techniques in its curriculum, but these were lost over time.

References

External links 
 LeBuJutsu.net

1530s establishments in Japan
Ko-ryū bujutsu
Japanese martial arts